The  and  were limited express train services in Japan operated by Japanese National Railways (JNR) and later East Japan Railway Company (JR East) from 1958 until 2002.

History
From 1960, new KiHa 81 series diesel multiple units were introduced on the service, reducing the journey time to 10 hours 25 minutes. From 1 October 1968, the train was routed via the more direct Tōhoku Main Line using 583 series electric multiple units.

The maximum speed was raised to  through the Seikan Tunnel from 16 March 1991.

New E751 series electric multiple units were introduced from 18 March 2000, with the trains running as Morioka – Aomori Super Hatsukari alongside the Morioka – Hakodate Hatsukari services using 485-3000 series EMUs.

The E751 series EMUs were reassigned to new Tsugaru limited express services operating between Hachinohe and Hirosaki.

Rolling stock
 KiHa 81 series DMUs (1960 – 1968)
 583 series EMUs (1 October 1968 – December 2002)
 485 series 6-car EMUs (March 1973 – December 2002)
 485-3000 series 6-car EMUs ( ? – December 2002)
 E751 series 6-car EMUs (Super Hatsukari, March 2000 – December 2002)

See also
 List of named passenger trains of Japan

References

Named passenger trains of Japan
East Japan Railway Company
Railway services introduced in 1958
Railway services discontinued in 2002